or JRCH is a private university in Kitami, Hokkaidō, Japan, established in 1999.

History 
The forerunners of Japanese Red Cross Hokkaido College of Nursing are the school of Nursing in Asahikawa (founded in 1923), Kitami (1939),and Kushiro (1966). These schools were integrated, and JRCH was established in 1999 by the Japanese Red Cross.

Faculties and graduate schools

Faculties
JRCH has only one faculty, Nursing.

Graduate schools
JRCH has two graduate schools:
 Major in Nursing science
 Major in Certified Nurse Midwife (CNM)

Centers
Center of Nurse Education

Partner universities
 Asahikawa Medical University
 Kitami Institute of Technology

See also
List of universities in Japan

References

External links
 Official website 

Educational institutions established in 1999
Private universities and colleges in Japan
Universities and colleges in Hokkaido
Nursing schools in Japan
1999 establishments in Japan